Bellator 265: Kongo vs. Kharitonov was a mixed martial arts event produced by Bellator MMA that took place on August 20, 2021 at the Sanford Pentagon in Sioux Falls, South Dakota, United States.

Background 
A heavyweight bout between #3 ranked Cheick Kongo and Sergei Kharitonov served as the main event.

A featherweight bout between #3 ranked Ádám Borics and #4 ranked Jay Jay Wilson was scheduled for this event. The bout was to determine the #1 contender who would face champion A. J. McKee. However, at the weigh-ins, Wilson came in at 150.4 pounds, missing weight by 4.4 pounds. As a result, the fight has been scrapped and Borics was paid his show money.

Number 5 ranked Welterweight Logan Storley made a return to his home state against Dante Schiro. 

A women's flyweight bout between Alejandra Lara and DeAnna Bennett was scheduled for Bellator 263. The bout was rescheduled for unknown reasons to take place at this event. On August 13, it was announced that the bout was moved once again, this time to Bellator 266.

A lightweight bout between Mike Hamel and Bryce Logan took place on the preliminary portion of the bout.

Two heavyweight prospects, Bailey Schoenfelder and Kevin Childs, were scheduled to compete in the event prelims. However, the bout did not happen after Childs withdrew from the contest. With Childs being scrapped from his bout, a contracted catchweight bout at 225 pounds was set between Bailey Schoenfelder and Kory Moegenburg.

A heavyweight bout between #6 ranked Steve Mowry and Marcelo Golm was scheduled for Bellator 264, however on August 4 it was announced that Steve Mowry was scratched from the bout, with Golm  facing Kelvin Tiller at this event. The week of the event, Tiller pulled out of the bout and he was replaced by promotional newcomer Billy Swanson.

A middleweight bout between Jeff Nielsen and Kory Moegenburg was cancelled the week off the event due to COVID-19 protocols.

Results

See also 

 2021 in Bellator MMA
 List of Bellator MMA events
 List of current Bellator fighters
 Bellator MMA Rankings

References 

Bellator MMA events
2021 in mixed martial arts
August 2021 sports events in the United States
2021 in sports in South Dakota
Mixed martial arts in South Dakota
Sports competitions in South Dakota